Marcos Leandro Pereira (born April 3, 1982 in Rio de Janeiro) is a Brazilian goalkeeper currently playing for America-RJ.

External links

zerozero.pt 
placar 
esportesyahoo 

1982 births
Living people
Brazilian footballers
Olaria Atlético Clube players
Bangu Atlético Clube players
Rio Claro Futebol Clube players
Fluminense FC players
Nova Iguaçu Futebol Clube players
Paraná Clube players
Botafogo de Futebol e Regatas players
Association football goalkeepers
America Football Club (RJ) players
Footballers from Rio de Janeiro (city)